Caroline Garcia defeated Petra Kvitová in the final, 6–2, 6–4, to win the women's singles tennis title at the 2022 Cincinnati Masters. It was her third WTA 1000 title, and her first since 2017. Garcia was the first qualifier to make the finals and win a WTA 1000 event.

Ashleigh Barty was the reigning champion, but retired from professional tennis in March 2022.

This was the penultimate professional tournament of 23 time grand slam champion and former world no. 1 Serena Williams in her career, she lost to Emma Raducanu in the first round.

Seeds 
The top eight seeds received a bye into the second round.

Draw

Finals

Top half

Section 1

Section 2

Bottom half

Section 3

Section 4

Seeded players 
The following are the seeded players. Seedings are based on WTA rankings as of August 8, 2022. Rank and points before are as of August 15, 2022.

The event is not mandatory on the women's side and points from the 2021 tournament are included in the table below only if they counted towards the player's ranking as of August 15, 2022. For other players, the points defending column shows the lower of (a) points from her second-highest non-mandatory WTA 1000 tournament (which are required to be counted in her ranking) or (b) her 16th best result.

Points defending will be replaced at the end of the tournament by (a) the player's points from the 2022 tournament, (b) her 17th best result, or (c) points from her second-highest non-mandatory WTA 1000 event.

† Points from the player's 16th best result (for points defending) or 17th best result (for points won), in each case as of August 15, 2022.
‡ Points from the player's second-best non-mandatory WTA 1000 event, which are required to be counted in her ranking.
§ The player is defending points from a WTA 125 tournament (Chicago).

Other entry information

Wild cards

Protected ranking

Withdrawals
Before the tournament

During the tournament

Retirements

Qualifying

Seeds

Qualifiers

Lucky losers

Qualifying draw

First qualifier

Second qualifier

Third qualifier

Fourth qualifier

Fifth qualifier

Sixth qualifier

Seventh qualifier

Eighth qualifier

References

External links 
Main draw
Qualifying draw

Women's Singles
Western and Southern Open - Women's Singles